The following is a list of paintings by the Italian artist Tintoretto, arranged chronologically. They are all oil on canvas unless otherwise noted.

1530s-1550s

Martyrdom of the Ten-Thousand, fragment, circa 1538, 138 × 218 cm, Gallerie dell'Accademia, Venice
Madonna and Child with Saint Joseph, Saint Jerome and the Procurator Girolamo Marcello, 1539, 148 × 193 cm, private collection
Adoration of the Shepherds, circa 1540, 172 × 274 cm, Fitzwilliam Museum, Cambridge
Modena ceilings, 1541-1542, Galleria Estense, Modena
Apollo and Daphen
Pyramus and Thisbe
Latona Turns the Peasaants of Lycia into Frogs
Apollo and Marsyas
Semele Burned to Death
Fall of Phaeton, 153 × 133 cm
Deucalion and Pyrrha
Mercury and Argus
Orpheus Begging Pluto
Niobe and her Daughters
Antiope and Jupiter, 127 × 123 cm
Venus, Vulcan and Cupid
Fall of Icarus
Rape of Europa, 126 × 124 cm
Christ Disputing with the Doctors, circa 1542-1543, 197 × 319 cm, Museo del Duomo, Milan
Supper at Emmaus, circa 1542-1544, 156 × 212 cm, Museum of Fine Arts, Budapest, 
Venus and Adonis, 1543-1544, 145 × 272 cm, Uffizi, Florence
The Siege of Asola, 1544-1545, 197 × 467,5 cm, private collection
Mystic Marriage of St Catherine with Saint Augustine, Saint Mark and Saint John the Baptist, circa 1545, 193 x 314 cm, Musée des Beaux-Arts, Lyon
Bible Stories of Vienna, circa 1544-1545, 29 × 157 cm, Kunsthistorisches Museum, Vienna, 
Solomon and the Queen of Sheba
Conversion of Belshazzar
Bearing the Ark of the Covenant
David Preaching
David and Bathsheba
Samson's Revenge
Conversion of Saul, circa 1545, 152 × 236 cm, National Gallery of Art, Washington
The Queen of Sheba Visits Solomon, 1545-1546, 150 × 237,5 cm, Bob Jones University, Greenville
Ecce homo, 1546-1547, 109 × 136 cm, Museu de Arte, São Paulo, Brazil
Christ and the Woman Caught in Adultery, circa 1546, 119 × 168 cm, Roma, Palazzo Barberini, Galleria nazionale d'arte antica
Self-Portrait, 1546–48, 45 × 38 cm, Philadelphia Museum of Art
Christ Washes the Disciples' Feet, circa 1547, 210 × 533 cm, Museo del Prado, Madrid
Portrait of Procurator Nicolò Priuli, circa 1547, 125 × 105 cm, Ca' d'Oro, Galleria Franchetti, Venice
Miracle of the Slave, 1548, 415 × 541 cm, Gallerie dell'Accademia, Venice
Saint Roch Healing Plague Victims, 1549, 307 × 673 cm, San Rocco, Venice
Saint Martialis in Glory with Saint Peter and Saint Paul, 1548-1549,  376×181 cm, San Marziale, Venice
The Miracle of Saint Augustine, 1549-1550, 255 x 174.5 cm, Museo Civico di Palazzo Chiericati, Vicenza.

1550s-1560s
Christ and the Woman Caught in Adultery, circa 1550, 158 × 277 cm, Museo diocesano, Milan
Visitation, circa 1550, 256 × 153 cm, Pinacoteca Nazionale di Bologna
Portrait of Procurator Jacopo Soranzo, circa 1550, 106 × 90 cm, Gallerie dell'Accademia, Venice
Portrait of Girolamo Pozzo, circa 1550, 111,8 × 93,9 cm, Royal Collection. Windsor Castle
Christ and the Woman Caught in Adultery, circa 1550, 160 × 225 cm, Rijksmuseum, Amsterdam, 
Mars and Venus Surprised by Vulcan, circa 1551-1552, 135 × 198 cm, Alte Pinakothek, Munich
Venus and Vulcan Doting on Cupid, 197 x 85, Galleria Palatina di Palazzo Pitti, Florence
Doors to the organ case for the church of Santa Maria dell'Orto, 1552-1556, church of Santa Maria dell'Orto, Venice
Presentation of the Virgin in the Temple, 429 × 480 cm
Saint Peter's Vision of the Cross, 420 × 240 cm
Beheading of Saint Paul, 430 × 240 cm
Paintings for the Scuola della Trinità, Venice, now in the Gallerie dell'Accademia
Creation of the Animals, 1550-1553, 151 × 258 cm
Creation of Adam and Eve, 1550-1553, 151 × 258 cm
Temptation of Adam and Eve, 1550-1553, 150 × 220 cm
Adam and Eve Before God, 1550-1553, 90 × 110 cm
Cain Kills Abel, 1550-1553, olio su tela, 149 × 196 cm
Paintings for the Palazzo dei Camerlenghi in Venice
Saint Louis of Toulouse and Saint George, circa 1553, 225 × 145 cm, Gallerie dell'Accademia, Venice
Saint Andrew and Saint Jerome, circa 1553, 225 × 145 cm, Gallerie dell'Accademia, Venice
Portrait of a Young Gentleman, circa 1553, 1025 × 89 cm, Galleria Doria Pamphilj, Rome
Nativity of Saint John the Baptist, circa 1550, 181 × 226 cm, Hermitage Museum, Saint Petersburg
Saint Nicholas of Bari, 1554-1555, 114 × 56 cm, Kunsthistorisches Museum, Vienna
Paintings for the chiesa dei crociferi
Presentation of Christ at the Temple, 1554-1556, 239 × 298 cm, Gallerie dell'Accademia, Venice
Assumption of the Virgin, 1555, 440 × 260 cm, Chiesa di Santa Maria Assunta detta I Gesuiti, Venice
Scenes from the Bible, circa 1555, Museo del Prado, Madrid
Susanna and the Elders, 58 × 116 cm
Esther Before Ahasuerus, 59 × 203 cm
Judith and Holofernes, 58 × 119 cm
Solomon and the Queen of Sheba, 58 × 205 cm
Joseph and Potiphar's Wife, 54 × 117 cm
Moses Saves from the Waters, 56 × 119 cm
Portrait of a Man in Armour, 1555-1556, 116 × 99 cm, Kunsthistorisches Museum, Vienna
Resurrection of Christ, circa 1555, 201 × 139 cm, Queensland Art Gallery, Brisbane, 
Lamentation over the Dead Christ, 1555-1556, Museo civico Amedeo Lia, La Spezia
Lamentation over the Dead Christ, 1555-1559, 51 x 75 cm, Museo Soumaya, Mexico City
The Deliverance of Arsinoe, circa 1556, 153 × 251 cm, Gemäldegalerie, Dresden
Susanna and the Elders, circa 1557, 147 × 194 cm, Kunsthistorisches Museum, Vienna
Christ Taken Down from the Cross, 1556-1558, 135,6 × 102 cm, Musée des Beaux-Arts, Caen
Saint George and the Dragon, circa 1558, 158 × 100 cm, National Gallery, London
Doors of the organ case for Santa Maria del Giglio, Venice, circa 1557-1558
Conversion of Saul, lost
Saint Luke and Saint Matthew, 259 × 150 cm
Saint Mark and Saint John the Evangelist, 257 × 150 cm
Tarquinius and Lucretia, circa 1559, 175,5 × 152 cm, The Art Institute, Chicago

1560s-1570s

Portrait of Doge Girolamo Priuli, 1560, 102 × 84 cm, Gallerie dell'Accademia, Venice
Saint Helen and Saint Barbara Adoring the Cross, circa 1560, 275 × 165 cm, Pinacoteca di Brera, Milan
Portrait of Alvise Cornaro, circa 1560-1565, 113 × 85 cm, Galleria Palatina, Florence
Lamentation over the Dead Christ circa 1560-1565, 94.7 x 141 cm, São Paulo Museum of Art, Brazil,
Portrait of procurator Antonio Cappello, circa 1561, 114 × 80 cm, Gallerie dell'Accademia, Venice
Christ Washes the Disciples' Feet, circa 1566, 200,6 × 408,3 cm, National Gallery, London
Deposition from the Cross, circa 1560, 227 × 294 cm, Gallerie dell'Accademia, Venice
Wedding Feast at Cana, 1561, 435 × 535 cm, Venezia, Basilica di Santa Maria della Salute
Portrait of Cardinal Marco Antonio Da Mula, 1562-1563, 187 × 103 cm, private collection
Paintings for the Scuola Grande di San Marco
Rediscovery of Saint Mark's Body, 1562-1566, 396 × 400 cm, Pinacoteca di Brera, Milan
Saint Mark's Body Brought to Venice, 1562-1566, 398 × 315 cm, Gallerie dell'Accademia, Venice
Saint Mark Saves a Saracen during a Shipwreck, 1562-1566, 398 × 337 cm, Gallerie dell'Accademia, Venice
Paintings for the choir of the church of Madonna dell'Orto, 1562-1564, church of Santa Maria dell'Orto, Venice
Worshipping the Golden Calf, 1450 × 580 cm
Last Judgement, 1450 × 590 cm
Temperance, 450 × 240 cm
Justice, 450 × 240 cm
Faith, 450 × 240 cm
Prudence, 450 × 240 cm
Courage, 450 × 240 cm
Pietà, 1563, 108 × 170 cm, Milan, Pinacoteca di Brera
Resurrection of Christ with Saint Cassian and Saint Cecilia, 1565, 450 x 225 cm, church of San Cassiano, Venice
Paintings for the Sala dell'Albergo in the Scuola Grande di San Rocco, 1564-1567, Scuola Grande di San Rocco, Venice
Ceiling
Saint Roch in Glory, 1564, 240 × 360 cm
Spring, 1564, 90 cm in diameter
Summer, 1564, 90 cm in diameter
Autumn, 1564, 90 cm in diameter
Winter, 1564, 90 cm in diameter
Allegory of the School of Saint John the Evangelist, 1564, 90 × 190 cm
Allegory of the School of Pity, 1564, 90 × 190 cm
Allegory of the School of Charity, 1564, 90 × 190 cm
Allegory of the School of Saint Mark, 1564, 90 × 190 cm
Allegory of the School of Saint Theodore, 1564, 90 × 190 cm
Happiness, 1564, 90 × 190 cm
Goodness, 1564, 90 × 190 cm
Generosity, 1564, 90 × 190 cm
Hope, 1564, 90 × 190 cm
Faith, 1564, 90 × 190 cm
Christ's Body Borne to the Sepulchre, circa 1565, 164 × 124 cm, National Gallery of Scotland, Edinburgh
Walls
Crucifixion, 1565, 536 × 1224 cm
Christ on the Way to Calvary, 1565-1567, 515 × 390 cm
Ecce Homo, 1566–67, 260 × 390 cm
Christ Before Pilate, 1566–67, 515 × 380 cm
Portrait of Jacopo Sansovino, circa 1566, 49 × 36 cm, Staatliche Kunstsammlungen, Weimar
Portrait of Jacopo Sansovino, circa 1566, 70 × 65 cm, Galleria degli Uffizi, Florence
Madonna of the Treasurers, circa 1566-1567, 221 × 521 cm, Gallerie dell'Accademia, Venice
Trinity, 1564-1568, 122 × 181 cm, Galleria Sabauda, Turin
Crucifixion, 1568, 341 × 371 cm, church of San Cassiano, Venice
Descent into Limbo, 1568, 342 × 373 cm, church of San Cassiano, Venice
Paintings for the chancel of the church of San Rocco, 1567, church of San Rocco, Venice
Saint Roch in Prison Comforted by an Angel, 300 × 670 cm
Saint Roch Healing the Animals, 230 × 670 cm
Saint Roch in the Desert, 230 × 670 cm
Portrait of Ottavio Strada, 1567, 128 × 101 cm, Rijksmuseum, Amsterdam
Christ in the House of Martha and Mary, 1567, 197,5 × 131 cm, Alte Pinakothek, Munich
Portrait of Doge Pietro Loredan, 1568-1570, 126 × 106,6 cm,  Kimbell Art Museum, Fort Worth (Texas),
Portrait of Doge Pietro Loredan, 1568-1570, 107 × 91 cm, National Gallery of Victoria, Melbourne, 
Portrait of Doge Pietro Loredan, 1568-1570, 125 × 100 cm, Museum of Fine Arts, Budapest

1570s-1580s
Christ Calming the Storm on the Sea of Galilee, circa 1570, 117.1 × 169,2 cm, National Gallery of Art, Washington, 
Danaë, circa 1570, 142 × 182 cm, Musée des Beaux-Arts, Lyon
Ultima Cena, circa 1570, 228 × 535 cm, San Polo, Venice
Madonna and Child or Madonna of the Stars, early 1570s, 92,7 × 72,7 cm, National Gallery of Art, Washington
Five Philosophers, 1570-1571, 250 × 160, Libreria Sansoviniana, Venice
Portrait of Sebastiano Venier with a Page, circa 1572, 195 × 130 cm, Palazzo Mocenigo, Venice
Madonna and Child with Saint Mark and Saint Luke, 1571-1572, 228 x 160 cm, Gemäldegalerie, Berlin
Madonna and Child, circa 1572-1573, 100 × 131 cm, Fine Arts Museums of San Francisco
Madonna and Child with the Family of Doge Alvise Mocenigo, circa 1573, 216 × 416,5 cm, National Gallery of Art, Washington
Assumption, 1574-1576, Chiesa Santa Maria Maggiore, Miglionico (Matera)
Susanna and the Elders, circa 1575, 150 × 103 cm, National Gallery of Art, Washington
The Origin of the Milky Way, 1575-1580, 148 × 165 cm, National Gallery, London
Paintings for the Anticollegio of the Palazzo Ducale, Venice, 1576-1577
Three Graces with Mercury, 146 × 155 cm
Ariadne, Venus and Bacchus, 146 × 167 cm
Minerva Driving out Mars, 148 × 168
Vulcan's Forge, 145 × 156
Temptation of Saint Antony, 1577, 282 × 165 cm, San Trovaso, Venice
Angel of the Annunciation, 1578, 115 × 93 cm, Rijksmuseum, Amsterdam
Virgin of the Annunciation, 1578, 119 × 93 cm, Rijksmuseum, Amsterdam
Leda and the Swan, circa 1578, 162 × 218 cm, Uffizi, Florence
The Muses, circa 1579, 2012 × 304 cm, Royal Collection, Windsor Castle
Judith and Holofernes, circa 1579, 188 × 251 cm, Museo del Prado, Madrid
Baptism of Christ, circa 1580, 283 x 162;cm, San Silvestro, Venice 
Paintings for the Scuola Grande di San Rocco, 1576-1581, Scuola Grande di San Rocco, Venice
Ceiling
Moses Sets up the Brazen Serpent, 840 × 520 cm
Moses Striking the Rock to Create a Fountain, 550 × 520 cm
Gathering the Manna, 550 × 520 cm
Original Sin, 265 × 370 cm
God Appearing to Moses, 370 × 265 cm
Column of Fire, 370 × 265 cm
Jonah Leaving the Belly of the Whale, 265 × 370 cm
Ezekiel's Vision, 660 × 265 cm
Jacob's Ladder, 660 × 265 cm
Sacrifice of Isaac, 265 × 370 cm
Elisha Multiplying the Loaves, 370 × 265 cm
Elijah Fed by an Angel, 370 × 265 cm
Passover of the Israelites, 265 × 370 cm
Abram and Melchizedek, 265 × 265 cm
Jeremiah's Vision, 265 × 265 cm
Elijah on the Chariot of Fire, 265 × 265 cm
Daniel Saved by an Angel, 265 × 265 cm
Samson Drawing Water from a Donkey's Jaw, 265 × 265 cm
Samuel and Saul, 265 × 265 cm
Moses Saved from the Waters, 265 × 265 cm
The Three Young Men in the Furnace, 265 × 265 cm
Walls
Saint Roch, 250 × 80 cm
Saint Sebastian, 250 × 80 cm
Adoration of the Shepherds, 542 × 455 cm
Baptism of Christ, 538 × 465 cm
Resurrection of Christ, 529 × 485 cm
The Agony in Gethsemane, 538 × 455 cm
Last Supper, 538 × 487
The Loaves and Fishes, 523 × 475 cm
Resurrection of Lazarus, 541 × 356
Ascension, 538 × 325
Christ Heals the Paralytic or Piscina probatica, 533 × 529 cm
Temptation of Christ, 539 × 330 cm
Ceiling of the Sala delle Quattro Porte, 1578-1581, Palazzo Ducale, Venice
Jupiter Proclaims Venus Queen of the Seas, 500 × 290 cm
Juno Brings Venus the Signs of Power, 290 cm in diameter
Venice, Protector of Liberty, 290 cm in diameter
Treviso, 150 × 115 cm
Vicenza, 150 × 115 cm
Altino, 150 × 115 cm
Friuli, 150 × 115 cm
Padua, 150 × 115 cm
Fasti of the Gonzagas, 1578-1580, Alte Pinakothek, Munich
Investiture of Gianfrancesco I, 272 × 432 cm
Ludovico III Defeats the Venetians near Legnago, 273 × 386 cm
Frederick I Liberates Legnano, 236 × 421 cm
Francesco II at the Battle of Taro, 269 × 421 cm
The Victorious Federico II Enters Milan, 206 × 334 cm
Frederick II Conquers Parma, 213 × 276 cm
Frederick II Conquers Pavia, 212 × 276 cm
Philip II Enters Mantua, 213 × 330 cm
Verona, 150 × 115 cm
Istria, 150 × 115 cm
Brescia, 150 × 115 cm

1580-1594

Saint Bartholomew, Saint Benedict and Blessed Bernardo Tolomei with the Commissioners Bartolomeo and Battista Malmignati, circa 1580, Lendinara (Rovigo), Santuario della Beata Vergine del Pilastrello
The Vision of Saint Nicholas, c.1582, Novo Mesto Cathedral, Slovenia
Portrait of Vincenzo Morosini, 1581-1582, 84,5 × 51,5 cm, National Gallery, London
Baptism of Christ, 1581-1582, 169 × 251,4 cm, Cleveland Museum of Art, Cleveland, Ohio, 
Paintings for the Sala del Senato, 1581-1584, Palazzo Ducale, Venice
Triumph of Venice as Queen of the Seas, 810 × 420 cm
Doge Pietro Loredan before the Madonna, 380 × 360 cm
The Dead Christ Supported by Angels and Adored by Doges Pietro Lando and Marcantonio Trevisan, 295 × 910 cm
Paintings for the Sala Inferiore, 1582-1587, Scuola Grande di San Rocco, Venice
Annunciation, 422 × 545 cm
Adoration of the Magi, 425 × 544 cm
Flight into Egypt, 422 × 580 cm
Massacre of the Innocents, 422 × 546 cm
Saint Mary Magdalene, 425 × 209 cm
Saint Mary of Egypt, 425 × 211 cm
Circumcision of Christ, 440 × 482 cm
Assumption of the Virgin, 425 × 587 cm
Visitation, circa 1588, 151 x 230 cm
Self-Portrait, circa 1588, 63 × 52 cm, Louvre, Paris
Adoration of the Magi, 1587, Santa Maria delle Vergini, Macerata
Martyrdom of Saint Lawrence, 1588, 126 × 191 cm, Christ Church Picture Gallery, Oxford
Paradise,  1588-1592, 700 × 2500 cm, Palazzo Ducale, Venice
Life of Saint Catherine, 1590-1592, Gallerie dell'Accademia, Venice
Saint Catherine Explaining to MaxentiusHer Reasons for Refusing to Adore Idols, 160 × 225 cm
Saint Catherine Disputing with the Doctors of Alexandria, 160 × 228 cm
Saint Catherine Whipped, 161 × 230 cm
Saint Catherine in Prison Assisted by Angels, 162 × 246 cm
The Martyrdom of Saint Catherine, 160 × 244 cm
Saint Catherine Led to the Place of Execution, 160 × 245 cm
Last Supper, Cattedrale di San Martino, Lucca
Paintings for San Giorgio Maggiore 1592-1594, Church of San Giorgio Maggiore, Venice
Gathering the Manna, 377 × 576 cm
Last Supper, 365 × 568 cm
Deposition of Christ, 288 × 166 cm

Unknown date

Crucifixion, Musei Civici agli Eremitani, Padua
Incision, Casa della cultura, Palmi
The Dead Christ Supported by an Angel, Galleria Nazionale di Arte Antica, Trieste

Attributed works
Saint Mark with Saint Jerome and Saint Bartholomew  and Annunciation, Korčula Cathedral, Croatia
Saint Christopher, Museo d'Arte Sacra San Martino, Alzano Lombardo, BG
Judgement of Paris, Palazzo Moroni, Padova
The Cercopes Transformed into Monkeys, Palazzo Moroni, Padova
Briseis Reproaches Achilles, Palazzo Moroni, Padova
Deucalion and Pyrrha, Palazzo Moroni, Padova
Apollo and Marsyas, Palazzo Moroni, Padova
Venus and Adonis, Palazzo Moroni, Padova 
Venus Lamenting the Dead Adonis, Palazzo Moroni, Padova
Jupiter and Semele, Palazzo Moroni, Padova.

Notes

References 

 
Tintoretto